Doris A. Smith (born September 25, 1952), known professionally as Toukie Smith is an American actress and model. Smith is best known for her role as Eva Rawley on the NBC sitcom 227 (1989–90). She is the sister of fashion designer Willi Smith.

Biography

Early life
Smith was born in Philadelphia, Pennsylvania, to a mother who worked at a factory and a father who was a butcher. She had two brothers, Willi Smith, the designer, and Norman Smith. She attended Fashion Institute of Technology.

Career
Smith started her career in 1972 as a model, working for such brands as Chanel, Versace, Geoffrey Beene, Issey Miyake, Norma Kamali, Thierry Mugler, and Patrick Kelly. She also modeled for her brother Willi Smith's brand WilliWear Ltd.

She also had a successful print career, including a photo campaign for Yves St. Laurent as well as appearances in the magazines Vogue, ELLE, Ebony, Cosmopolitan, Redbook, and Seventeen. In 1978, Smith was named Bloomingdale's Model of the Year and became the second African–American model to have a mannequin designed in her likeness. Besides 227, her other credits include Talkin' Dirty After Dark (1991),  Joe's Apartment (1994), and The Preacher's Wife (1996). Smith had a restaurant in the West Village neighborhood of New York City called Toukie's.

Personal life
From 1985 to 1996, Smith's long–term partner was actor Robert De Niro, with whom she had twin sons (Aaron Kendrick De Niro and Julian Henry De Niro, born 1995) conceived by in vitro fertilization and delivered by a surrogate mother. Smith said that the name "Toukie" comes from her grandmother, who used to play her a song about a fire engine that had a lot of energy. She now resides in NYC in Battery Park City.

Filmography 
 1987–88: Miami Vice
 1988: Me and Him
 1989–90: 227
 1991: Talkin' Dirty After Dark
 1994: I Like It Like That
 1996: Joe's Apartment
 1996: The Preacher's Wife
 1999: Goosed

References

External links

1955 births
African-American actresses
American television actresses
American female models
African-American female models
African-American models
Living people
Actresses from Philadelphia
De Niro family